Stegerwaldsiedlung is a station on the Cologne Stadtbahn lines 3 and 4, located in the Cologne district of Mülheim.

See also 
 List of Cologne KVB stations

External links 
 station info page 

 

Cologne KVB stations
Mülheim, Cologne